Ingrid Svantepolksdotter (floruit 1350), was a Swedish noble and abbess. She is foremost known for being the central figure in one of the famous incidents referred to as the Maiden Abduction from Vreta, where she, like her mother before her, was abducted from Vreta Abbey by the man she later married. Later in life, she became an abbess at the very same abbey, in which position she served in 1323–1344.

Ingrid was the daughter of Svantepolk of Viby and Benedicta of Bjelbo and thereby niece of Queen Catherine of Sweden. She was engaged to the Danish noble David Torstensson, but placed in the Vreta Abbey as a child to be educated prior to marriage; her sister Catherine was also placed there, but in her case to join the order. In 1287, Ingrid was abducted by the Norwegian jarl Folke Algotsson, which became the third of the famous Maiden Abductions from Vreta, the two previous having been the abductions of her mother and maternal grandmother. Folke took her to Norway, where they married. Ingrid returned to Sweden after Folkes death in 1310. Before March 1322, she became a member of the Vreta Abbey, and in 1323, she succeeded her sister as its abbess. She abdicated in 1344, and is last mentioned in 1350, when she temporarily served as abbess between the death of the former abbess and before the election of the next.

References
Agneta Conradi Mattsson: Riseberga kloster, Birger Brosa & Filipssönerna, Vetenskapliga skrifter utgivna av Örebro läns museum 2, 1998, 
Dick Harrison: Jarlens sekel - En berättelse om 1200-talets Sverige, Ordfront, Stockholm, 2002, 
Kristin Parikh: Kvinnoklostren på Östgötaslätten under medeltiden. Asketiskt ideal - politisk realitet, Lund University Press, Lund, 1991

Swedish Roman Catholic abbesses
14th-century Swedish nobility
14th-century Swedish nuns